Grand Canyon Railway No. 29 is the sole example of the class "SC-3" 2-8-0 "Consolidation" type steam locomotive. It was built by the American Locomotive Company (ALCO) in Pittsburgh, Pennsylvania in May 1906 for use in hauling carloads of iron ore on branch lines of the Lake Superior and Ishpeming Railroad as engine No. 14, and it was renumbered 29 in 1923. It was retired from revenue service in 1956. In 1963, it was sold to the Marquette and Huron Mountain Railroad, but it never ran there, and it was eventually sold to the Mid-Continent Railway Museum. Since 1990, it has resided at the Grand Canyon Railway as a running mate to former Chicago, Burlington and Quincy 2-8-2 No. 4960. As of 2023, though, it is going through a 1,472-day FRA boiler inspection.

History

Original Service Life 

In the 1900s, the Lake Superior and Ishpeming railroad needed stronger locomotives to replace their 1880s-built 0-4-0s to pull passenger and iron ore trains  between West Ishpeming and Marquette. In 1902, the LS&I sold three of their 0-4-0s to the Hicks Locomotive and Car Works and then they ordered three B-4 class 2-8-0 "Consolidation" type locomotives that would be numbered 14–16. First, numbers 15 and 16 arrived in 1905 from the Baldwin Locomotive Works, and they were worth $14,697 each. The following year, 1906, No. 14 arrived from the American Locomotive Company’s (ALCO) former Pittsburgh Locomotive and Car Works in Pittsburgh, Pennsylvania, and it had a different appearance than 15 and 16, and it was purchased at a cost of $15,800.

When No. 14 was put into service, it bore the brunt of ore hauling, since it was capable of rolling up a %1.6 grade between Marquette and Negaunee, pulling 45 loaded hopper cars. With the capability of 43,304 pounds of tractive effort, cylinder dimensions of 22 x 30 inches, and a boiler pressure of 200 pounds per square inch, it was found to be more powerful than the two Baldwin built B-4s, and it was deemed to be the most powerful rod locomotive in the Upper Peninsula of Michigan. However, upon arrival of the larger SC-1 class in 1916, the B-4 class was beginning to appear as a redundant to the LS&I. No. 14 was subsequently reassigned as a dock switcher in the docks in the Marquette division, and the locomotive operating in the mainline became less common after being involved in a wash-out wreck two months after the SC-1s were delivered.

In 1923, the LS&I received some additional 2-8-0s, after purchasing the Munising, Marquette and Southeastern Railway, so a renumbering system and reclassification system were in order, and the B-4s were reclassified as SC-3s (SC meaning Superheated Consolidations) and renumbered 27–29. No. 14 was renumbered 29, and the number 14 was given to a 2-8-2 Mikado the railroad had purchased from the bankrupt Duluth and Northern Minnesota Railroad. In 1925, No. 29 was sent to the Presque Isle shops to be heavily rebuilt to improve its performance; it was modified with cylinder saddles, disk pilot wheels, and a wider firebox. No. 29 was subsequently reassigned to pulling local freight trains between Marquette and Munising. The locomotive was modified again in 1934 with an aluminum cab, and it's tender was also rebuilt and given some booster trucks from SC-1 locomotive No. 32. During World War II, No. 29 was reassigned to pull heavier freight trains in the Ishpeming region, and it remained there, until the LS&I decided to fully dieselize by the early 1960s. No. 29 was retired in 1956, and it was stored as an emergency back up inside an auxiliary roundhouse that was used for steaming ore.

Early preservation 
By 1963, the railroad had only twelve steam locomotives left on their roster, all of which were 2-8-0s. That same year, though, they sold almost all of the 2-8-0s, as well as some of their passenger cars, to the Marquette and Huron Mountain (M&HM) Tourist Railroad. The tourist railroad’s owner, John A. Zerbal, had planned to bring all of old consolidations back to service for use in excursion service. However, No. 29 has never pulled any trains for the M&HM. Instead, No. 29 sat with the rest of the 2-8-0s in the form of a scrapline.

The M&HM ceased operations in 1984 when Mr. Zerbal passed away, and the remnants of their active roster were retired. In 1985, the remaining 2-8-0s that were once owned by the M&HM were sold back to the LS&I, and a few months later, No. 29 was sold at an auction along with SC-4 No. 22 to the Mid-Continent Railway Museum in North Freedom, Wisconsin. It received a cosmetic restoration to be put on static display in 1988.

Grand Canyon Railway 

In 1988, the Grand Canyon Railway, a former Atchison Topeka & Santa Fe branch line that ran between Williams, Arizona and the South rim of the Grand Canyon National Park, was bought by Max and Thelma Biegert, a couple from Phoenix. The first locomotives the new company purchased were four Ex-LS&I 2-8-0s; 18, 19, 20, and of course, 29. No. 18 was restored to operation first, and it did the honors of pulling the inaugural excursion. After that, No. 29 was also going through an operational restoration. During the process, it was modified with a centered headlight and a conversion to burn oil. It went through a rolling test in January 1990, and a couple months later, it was test fired and moved under its own power for the first time in thirty-four years. No. 29 ran excursion runs between Williams and the Grand Canyon Village for five years in the 1990s. 

In 1995, No. 29 was taken out of service, and sometime later, it was stored in the locomotive shops, where it received a thorough overhaul that lasted until 2004. In 2005, No. 29 and Ex-Chicago, Burlington and Quincy 2-8-2 No. 4960 performed a double header between Williams and the Grand Canyon Village, as well as taking part in a night photo session where the two steamers sat side by side in front of the old log depot. From 2004 to 2008, No. 29 resumed its career as a tourist locomotive, and during that same timeframe, all of No. 29's distant sister engines on the railway were sold off, making No. 29 the last 2-8-0 on the property.

In 2008, after the entirety of the GCRY was purchased by Xanterra Travel Collection, steam operations were ceased due to environmental concerns. The following year, steam operations resumed, but they became limited on when they could run ever since. Meanwhile, No. 29 remained on static display in front of the Williams depot for the next five years. Sometimes, during Christmas, it would often be re-lettered Polar Express while still on display at Williams. In 2014, No. 29 was removed from the Williams depot with Ex-Spokane, Portland and Seattle 2-8-2 No. 539 taking its display spot, and the husky consolidation was moved to the GCV Log depot, where it remained on display for one more year. In 2016, No. 29 was given a hydrostatic test fire along with some minor repairs to make it run again, and it was subsequently ready to perform another double header with No. 4960 for the centennial of the National Park Service. On June 10 of the following year, the GCRY was the recipient of the 2017 Arizona Governor’s Award for Outstanding Historical and Cultural Preservation, in honor of bringing No. 29 back to service. On May 21, 2019, No. 29 was re lettered to Atchison, Topeka and Santa Fe to be filmed by MacGillivray Freeman Films to make several appearances in Out Where the West Begins, a four-episode documentary series narrated by Tom Selleck and directed by Tom Brainard and Greg MacGillivray. The locomotive ran a few more excursions for the GCRY, until October 27, 2019, when the locomotive was placed in storage inside the shops for more time out of service. As of 2023, No. 29 is going through a 1,472-day inspection required by the Federal Railroad Administration (FRA). It will likely run again within a few years.

Historical significance 
No. 29 is the oldest LS&I locomotive that is preserved, as well as the only LS&I survivor to ever experience an accident. It is also the only surviving example of the LS&I’s SC-3 class, and the only one to be built by Alco.

No. 29 is the world’s only 2-8-0 to ever support a Worthington SA and the only 2-8-0 in the United States to support a Lempor ejector system.

Accidents and incidents 

 On June 2, 1916, when the 29 was numbered 14, it figured in a wash-out wreck while coming down from Negaunee with an iron ore train. The locomotive and several hopper cars rolled down on their sides on a steep embankment. The possible cause of this derailment was the fact it was heavily raining in many Northern Midwest areas that day. It took about a month to get the 14 "on its pins" again, meaning the 14 was brought back to service after some repairs were done. It is unclear if the engineer, fireman, or leading brakeman were injured or killed.

See also 

 Western Maryland Scenic Railroad 734
Lake Superior and Ishpeming 33
Duluth and Northern Minnesota 14
Lake Superior and Ishpeming 18
 Grand Canyon Railway 4960

External links 

 Grand Canyon Railway Official Website

References 

2-8-0 locomotives
Railway locomotives introduced in 1906
Standard gauge steam locomotives
Standard gauge locomotives of the United States
Individual locomotives of the United States
Freight locomotives
Lake Superior and Ishpeming locomotives
Preserved steam locomotives of Arizona